Angelo Parisi (born 3 January 1953 in Arpino, Frosinone, Italy) is a French judoka and olympic champion. He won a gold medal in the heavyweight division at the 1980 Summer Olympics in Moscow. At his Olympic debut in 1972 he represented Great Britain.
He holds the 8th dan degree.

References

External links
 

1953 births
Living people
People from Arpino
British male judoka
French male judoka
Olympic judoka of France
Olympic judoka of Great Britain
Judoka at the 1972 Summer Olympics
Judoka at the 1980 Summer Olympics
Judoka at the 1984 Summer Olympics
Olympic gold medalists for France
Olympic silver medalists for France
Olympic bronze medallists for Great Britain
Olympic medalists in judo
Knights of the Ordre national du Mérite
Italian male judoka
Medalists at the 1984 Summer Olympics
Medalists at the 1980 Summer Olympics
Medalists at the 1972 Summer Olympics
Sportspeople from the Province of Frosinone